
Gallwey may refer to:

People
Henry Galway (Henry Gallwey  before 1911), British Army officer and Governor of South Australia 
Peter Gallwey, English Jesuit priest and writer
Timothy Gallwey, American tennis coach and writer
Ralph Payne-Gallwey, British soldier and writer

Payne-Gallwey baronets
Frankland-Payne-Gallwey baronets
William Payne-Gallwey (disambiguation)
Sir William Payne-Gallwey, 1st Baronet
Sir William Payne-Gallwey, 2nd Baronet

Places
Gallwey, South Australia, a former town

See also
Ferriman–Gallwey score